John Visentin (October 23, 1962 – June 28, 2022) was an American executive. He was the chief executive officer of Xerox from 2018 until his death in 2022.

References

1962 births
2022 deaths
American business executives
Xerox people